The 2020 Little League World Series was scheduled to take place during August 20–30, 2020, at the Little League headquarters complex in South Williamsport, Pennsylvania. It was canceled on April 30, 2020, due to the COVID-19 pandemic.

Cancellation 

Talks of cancellation or postponement began in early March as professional sports leagues such as the NBA, NHL, MLB, MLR, and MLS suspended their seasons. In an April 15 interview with the Associated Press, Little League president and CEO Stephen Keener spoke on the challenging decision in regards to the World Series and coronavirus. One of the most prominent resolutions to the situation would be moving the World Series back and playing later in the fall, possibly late September, October or even November. However, Keener negated that idea:

On April 30, 2020, Little League Baseball announced the cancellation of the 2020 World Series and its regional tournaments for baseball and softball.

Little League said in a press release:

Little League's president and CEO said in the release:

2020 MLB Little League Classic 
The 2020 edition of the MLB Little League Classic game at Williamsport's BB&T Ballpark at Historic Bowman Field was to feature the Boston Red Sox and the Baltimore Orioles in the first American League matchup for the event on August 23; it was also cancelled on April 30, 2020. The matchup was retained in the revised schedule for both teams on the same date, instead played in Baltimore.

References 

Little League World Seriess
2020
2020 in sports in Pennsylvania
Little League World Series
2020 in baseball